Miguel Mora Gornals (11 September 1936 – 5 May 2012) was a Spanish cyclist. He competed in the team pursuit at the 1960 Summer Olympics.

References

External links
 

1936 births
2012 deaths
Spanish male cyclists
Olympic cyclists of Spain
Cyclists at the 1960 Summer Olympics
Sportspeople from Mallorca
Cyclists from the Balearic Islands